Dabadie is a surname. Notable people with the surname include: 

 Henri-Bernard Dabadie, French baritone
 Jean-Loup Dabadie, French academician